The bark spud (also known as a peeling iron, peeler bar, peeling spud, or abbreviated to spud) is an implement which is used to remove bark from felled timber.

Construction
Most bark spuds have steel heads and wooden handles, typically hickory or ash. The head is curved, sometimes in one direction with a single cutting edge, and sometimes more dish shaped and sharpened on three sides.

Method of use
In use, the sharpened edge is slid between the bark and the wood, removing the bark from the tree in a number of strips. It is especially useful at removing bark without damaging the wood below the bark.

Similar tools
A coa de jima is a similar specialized tool for harvesting agaves. The drawknife also removes bark from felled trees.

References 

Mechanical hand tools
Green woodworking tools
Forestry